Waterloo is an unincorporated community in Waterloo Township, Fayette County, Indiana.

History
Waterloo was platted in 1841. It took its name from Waterloo Township.

On May 14, 1883, a tornado struck the town, destroying all but three buildings, injuring one, and leaving 75 people homeless. On April 25, 1961, an F4 tornado hit the town, destroying multiple homes and buildings, but fortunately causing no casualties in the town.

Geography

References

Unincorporated communities in Fayette County, Indiana
Unincorporated communities in Indiana